Phlox carolina, the thickleaf phlox, is a species of flowering plant in the family Polemoniaceae.
The specific epithet carolina refers to its native habitat in the eastern United States. It grows in woodland edges and openings. Flowers attract bees, hummingbirds, and butterflies.

It is the parent of numerous garden cultivars, of which 'Bill Baker' (pink) and 'Miss Lingard' (pure white) have gained the Royal Horticultural Society's Award of Garden Merit.

References

carolina
Flora of North America
Flora of the United States
Perennial plants
Plants described in 1762
Taxa named by Carl Linnaeus